Lamb's Creek Church is an historic Episcopal church located off Virginia Route 3 on Lamb's Creek Road in Sealston, King George County, Virginia, in the United States. On September 22, 1972, Lamb's Creek Church was added to the National Register of Historic Places.

National Register listing
Lamb's Creek Church ** (added 1972 - Building - #72001403)
VA 607, Sealston
Historic Significance: 	Event, Architecture/Engineering
Architect, builder, or engineer: 	Ariss, John
Architectural Style: 	Colonial
Area of Significance: 	Architecture, Religion
Period of Significance: 	1750-1799
Owner: 	Private
Historic Function: 	Religion
Historic Sub-function: 	Religious Structure
Current Function: 	Religion
Current Sub-function: 	Religious Structure

Current use
Lamb's Creek Church is still in occasional use and is one of four historic churches in King George County, Virginia. The current mother church of the county is St. John's Episcopal Church near the county courthouse in King George, although ironically it is the only one of the county's historic churches not built in the colonial era (built in 1843 after the courthouse's relocation). It, Emmanuel Episcopal Church (also now with occasional services) and Lamb's Creek Church form the Hanover-with-Brunswick Parish of the Episcopal Diocese of Virginia. The other active parish in King George County is St. Paul's Episcopal Church near Dahlgren, Virginia. Lambs Creek Church is available for weddings and other events. The Episcopalians of King George hold their annual homecoming service at Lambs Creek Church on the last Sunday of August. The slate-floored church is also used annually for blessing of the animals in early October.

References

External links

Lamb's Creek Church (Episcopal), State Route 694, Comorn, King George County, VA: 3 photos, 3 measured drawings, and 1 photo caption page at Historic American Buildings Survey
 Lamb's Creek Church Cemetery
Hanover-with-Brunswick Episcopal Parish, includes Lamb's Creek Episcopal Church

Historic American Buildings Survey in Virginia
1713 establishments in Virginia
Churches completed in 1769
Churches on the National Register of Historic Places in Virginia
Cemeteries in King George County, Virginia
Episcopal churches in Virginia
Churches in King George County, Virginia
Religious organizations established in the 1710s
Georgian architecture in Virginia
18th-century Episcopal church buildings
John Ariss buildings
Colonial architecture in Virginia
National Register of Historic Places in King George County, Virginia